Jake Raburn (born January 15, 1985) is a Republican politician and a former member of the Florida House of Representatives, representing the 57th District, which includes eastern Hillsborough County, from 2012 to 2018.

History

Raburn was born in Plant City and graduated from Plant City High School, after which he attended the University of Florida, where he graduated with a degree in agricultural communication in 2007. He then joined the Florida Department of Citrus, working as a marketing specialist for two years. Afterwards, Raburn began working for Hinton Farms Produce, Inc., a farming operation owned by his wife's family, as a marketing director

Florida House of Representatives
In 2012, following the reconfiguration of the Florida House of Representatives districts, Raburn ran in the newly created 57th District, which was based in the rural, eastern parts of Hillsborough County. He was opposed in the Republican primary by Brian Hollands; the Tampa Bay Times endorsed Raburn over Hollands, praising him as "more supportive of the public schools" and noting that Raburn "also had a broader outlook on the need to invest in transportation and other infrastructure." He ultimately defeated Hollands with nearly 70% of the vote. In the general election, he faced Bruce Barnett, the Democratic nominee, and earned the endorsement of the Tampa Tribune, which, although it observed that "Barnett is more knowledgeable on growth and education issues," Raburn deserved the nod because he "offers the valuable perspective of a farmer and seems well-connected to the district." In the end, Raburn defeated Barnett by a solid margin of victory, winning 58% of the vote. In 2014, Raburn was re-elected to his second term in the legislature without opposition.

References

External links
Florida House of Representatives - Jake Raburn
Raburn for State House

1985 births
Living people
Republican Party members of the Florida House of Representatives
21st-century American politicians
People from Plant City, Florida